The S-III (pronounced "S 3") was a proposed third stage of the early Saturn C designs for a five-stage Saturn launch vehicle.  The Saturn C configurations were based on a "building block" approach, in which the upper stages would be test-flown before the intermediate stages.  The S-III was to have been fueled with liquid oxygen and liquid hydrogen and powered by two J-2 engines.  The original Saturn C-2 design would have been a three- or four-stage launch vehicle using the S-I plus S-III plus S-IV stages plus, for some missions, S-V.

References

Free return trajectory simulation, Robert A. Braeunig, August 2008
 
Stuhlinger, Ernst, et al., Astronautical Engineering and Science: From Peenemuende to Planetary Space, McGraw-Hill, New York, 1964.

Rocket stages